Aya is a male or female name with multiple meanings in many different languages. In Old German, Aya means "sword". 

Aya (あや, アヤ) is a common female Japanese given name meaning "design", "colorful" or "beautiful". Aya is also an Arabic feminine name written as آية meaning "wonderful", "amazing", "miracle" or "verse" (of a religious scripture such as the Quran or Bible). Aya is also in use in Hebrew and means "to fly swiftly" or "bird".  In Mongolian, similar to Turkish, it means "goodness", "music", and "melody". In Chemehuevi, Aya means "tortoise". In Baoule on the Ivory Coast, Aya is often given to a female born on Friday.

In the Raute language of Nepal, Aya refers to one's sister-in-law. The word originates from the Proto-Tibeto-Burman ’ay (alternate form yay) meaning "mother". In the Urdu language the word Aya refers to bees, caretaker, or nurse for young children. Typically in Pakistan ayas work in early childhood centres or primary schools.

In Turkish-Altaic mythology, Aya symbolizes the good soul. All the seventeen types of benevolent angels who live in the sky are also called Ayas. They are seen as the source of abundance and creativity on Earth. The word comes from Ay ("moon" in Turkish).  Ayaçı means "creative soul". In the mythology of Yakut Turks, Siberia Aya transforms  into Abası, symbolizing the same angels. Yürüng Aya Toron (the white creative soul, sun) was believed to be the creator of the Ayas and the universe. The best foods are given to Aya during Isıah (birthday of nature) Festivals.

There are several alternative spellings including Ayah and Aiya. There is also an African Adinkra symbol called an Aya, which is a fern. It is a symbol of endurance and resourcefulness.

Possible writings in Japanese
Aya can be written using different kanji characters and can mean:
絢, "kimono design"
綾, "twill" "design" "complicated reason"
彩, "coloring"
理, "truth, logic"
亜矢, "sub-(Ateji), arrow"
亜弥, "sub-(Ateji), all the more"
亜夜, "sub-(Ateji), night"
順, "order, sequence, turn"
文, "writings"
The name can also be written in hiragana or katakana.

People

Given name
Aya (queen), Ancient Egyptian queen during the 18th century BCE
Saint Aya (died c. 711), Belgian catholic saint
Aya Stefanowicz (born 1983), Polish singer of the gothic-metal band UnSun
Aya Cash (born 1982), American actress
Aya Domenig (born 1972), Japanese-Swiss filmmaker
Aya Jamal Eddine (born 1997), Lebanese footballer
Aya Endō (綾, born 1980), Japanese voice actress
Aya Fujita (綾, born 1987), Japanese shogi player
Aya Goda (彩, born 1967), Japanese painter
Aya Hirano (綾, born 1987), Japanese voice actress
Aya Hirayama (あや, born 1984), Japanese actress
Aya Hisakawa (綾, born 1968), Japanese voice actress
Aya Ishiguro (彩, born 1978), Japanese singer 
Aya Ishizu (彩, born 1972), Japanese voice actress
Aya Itō, better known as Luna Haruna (born 1991), Japanese singer and fashion model
Aya Jones (born 1994), French model
Aya Al Jurdi (born 1998), Lebanese footballer
Aya Kamikawa (あや (born 1968), Japanese politician
Aya Kamiki (彩矢, born 1985), Japanese singer
Aya Kanno (文, born 1980), Japanese manga artist
Aya Kawai (彩, born 1975), Japanese figure skater
Aya Kida (綾, born 1974), Japanese photographer
Aya Kiguchi (亜矢, born 1985), Japanese race queen and gravure idol
Aya Kitō (亜也, 1962–1988), Japanese writer
Aya Kōda (文, 1904–1990), Japanese essayist and novelist
Aya Korem (born 1980), Israeli singer and songwriter
Aya Koren (born 1979), Israeli actress
Aya Liu (born 1978), Taiwanese actress and presenter
Aya Majdi (born 1994), Qatari table tennis player
Aya Matsuura (亜弥, born 1986), Japanese singer
Aya Medany (born 1988), Egyptian pentathlete
Aya Mikami (彩, born 1984), Japanese volleyball player
Aya Miyama (あや, born 1985), Japanese soccer player
Aya Nakahara (アヤ, born 1973), Japanese manga artist
Aya Nakamura, Malian-born French pop singer
Aya Nakano (綾, born 1985), Japanese singer
Aya Ohori (彩, born 1996), Japanese badminton player
Aya Okamoto (綾, born 1982), Japanese actress
Aya Ōmasa (大政 絢, born 1991), Japanese model and actress
Aya Sameshima (彩, born 1987), Japanese soccer player
Aya Shibata (阿弥, born 1993), Japanese tarento and announcer 
Aya Shimokozuru (綾, born 1982), Japanese soccer player
Aya Sugimoto (彩, born 1968), Japanese actress
Aya Sumika (born 1980), American actress
Aya Suzaki (綾, born 1986), Japanese voice actress
Aya Takano (綾, born 1976), Japanese artist and science fiction essayist
Aya Takano (swimmer) (綾, born 1994), Japanese swimmer
Aya Takeuchi (亜弥, born 1986), Japanese rugby sevens player
Aya Tanimura (born 1980), Australian-Japanese writer and director
Aya Tarek, Egyptian artist
Aya Terakawa (綾, born 1984), Japanese backstroke swimmer
Aya Traoré (born 1983), Senegalese basketball player
Aya Uchida (彩, born 1986), a Japanese voice actress
Aya Ueto (彩, born 1985), Japanese actress
, Japanese table tennis player
, Japanese handball player

Surname
 Ramzi Aya (born 1990) Italian footballer

Mythological figures
Aya (goddess), Akkadian goddess

Fictional characters
Aya of Yopougon, the protagonist of the comic book series Aya of Yop City
Aya Asagiri, main character from the Magical Girl Site series 
Aya Ayano, a character in Another (novel) 
Aya Brea, a main character in the Parasite Eve video games
Aya Drevis, main character in the horror video game Mad Father
Aya Ikeuchi (亜也), a protagonist in the Japanese television drama 1 Litre no Namida
Aya Iseshima (綾), main character in Master of Martial Hearts
Aya Komichi, in the manga Kin-iro Mosaic 
Aya Kominato (小湊 亜耶), character in the manga and anime series "Blue Spring Ride" (Ao Haru Ride)
Aya Natsume (亜夜), in the manga and anime series Tenjho Tenge
Aya Maruyama, from the BanG Dream! franchise
Aya Mikage (妖), main character in Ceres, Celestial Legend
Aya Odagiri, from the television series Chōjin Sentai Jetman
Aya Shameimaru (文), in the Touhou Project video game series
Aya Toujou, a main character in the manga and anime series Strawberry 100%
Aya Valero, a main character in the fantasy movie Wattpad
Aya (DC Comics), from Green Lantern: The Animated Series
Aya, the protagonist in the novel Extras
Aya, main character in the video game series OneChanbara
Aya of Alexandria, in the video game Assassin's Creed Origins
Aya, in the video game Infinite Undiscovery
Kokudo Aya, a Sentinel Miko character in  Kusunoki Mebuki is a Hero.

See also 
Aya (disambiguation)

References 

Japanese feminine given names
Arabic feminine given names
Hebrew feminine given names
English-language feminine given names